RatSat or DemoSat was an aluminum mass simulator on the fourth flight of the Falcon 1 rocket, launched on 28 September 2008. Ratsat remained bolted to the second stage of the carrier rocket after reaching low Earth orbit. It is an aluminium alloy chamber in hexagonal prism shape with 1.5 m (5 ft) length.

The Falcon 1 launch that carried Ratsat to orbit was the first successful orbital launch of any privately funded and developed, liquid-propellant carrier rocket, the SpaceX Falcon 1, something only six nations had successfully accomplished previously.

The launch, identified as Falcon 1 Flight 4, was conducted by SpaceX, and also marked the first time the Falcon 1 rocket successfully achieved orbit, after three consecutive failures on the three previous launch attempts.

The RatSat was constituted by combining first letters of last names of Jeff Richichi, Ray Amador and Chris Thompson, who were part of SpaceX structures team responsible for payload.

Background

Preparations
When the fourth flight was first announced in August 2008, shortly after the third flight failed, it was planned for launch in September. The rocket that was used to conduct the test flight was originally built to launch the RazakSAT satellite. The test flight was introduced into the launch schedule because Astronautic Technology Sdn Bhd (ATSB) required a successful flight to be conducted before RazakSAT could be launched.

The schedule left very little time for modifications and testing. The rocket was shipped to the company's testing facilities in Texas where, after less than 24 hours, it was certified for launch. SpaceX chartered a United States Air Force C-17 flight on 3–4 September to carry both stages of the rocket 9,700 km (6,000 mi) to the launch facilities at the Kwajalein Atoll. The Falcon 1 rocket was successfully test-fired on 20 September. Launch preparations on 23 September led the ground crew to replace part of a pipeline supplying liquid oxygen to the second stage Kestrel engine. This work delayed the launch to 28 September.

Launch
The launch occurred from Omelek Island, part of the Kwajalein Atoll in the Marshall Islands. Liftoff occurred at 23:15 UTC on 28 September, 15 minutes into a five-hour launch window. If the launch had been scrubbed, it could have been conducted during the same window until 1 October. Nine minutes and 31 seconds after launch, the second stage engine shut down, after the vehicle reached orbit.

It was Falcon 1's first successful launch, and the first successful orbital launch of any privately funded and developed, liquid-propellant carrier rocket.

The rocket followed the same trajectory as the previous flight, which had failed to place the Trailblazer, NanoSail-D, PRESat and Celestis Explorers spacecraft into orbit. No major changes were made to the rocket, other than increasing the time between first stage burnout and second stage separation. This minor change addressed the failure seen on the previous flight, recontact between the first and second stages, by dissipating residual thrust in the enhanced first stage engine in vacuum before separation.

Although SpaceX was working on concepts to recover the first stage of Falcon 1 launch vehicles, as of this launch, they had not yet succeeded in doing so. Stage recovery was a non-primary goal of the early flights. SpaceX utilized an incremental development process to iterate the design issues of booster stage recovery. CEO Elon Musk stated that the probability of a successful recovery would increase with subsequent flights, however the Falcon 1 was subsequently retired from service after its fifth launch, with first stage recovery never having been accomplished successfully. The first stage of the successor rocket, the Falcon 9, became reusable.

See also

 2008 in spaceflight

References

Spacecraft launched by Falcon rockets
Derelict satellites orbiting Earth
Spacecraft launched in 2008
Test spaceflights